The 1905 VFL Grand Final was an Australian rules football game contested between the Fitzroy Football Club and Collingwood Football Club, held at the Melbourne Cricket Ground in Melbourne on 30 September 1905. It was the 8th annual Grand Final of the Victorian Football League, staged to determine the premiers for the 1905 VFL season. The match, attended by 28,000 spectators, was won by Fitzroy by a margin of 13 points, marking that club's fourth premiership victory and second in succession.

Background
the home-and-away season of 1905, Collingwood had dominated, losing only two games, one of them in the opening round to Fitzroy and the other to Essendon in the fourteenth round. Fitzroy had been on top until the return match between the two sides in the eighth round, but slumped a little during the latter half of the season with losses to Geelong and Carlton, plus a draw with South Melbourne. In the finals, however, Fitzroy had bounced back against Essendon, whilst Collingwood had failed badly against the Blues - losing by 46 points, which was a big margin at the time.

September 1905 was by far the coldest September ever known in Melbourne since records began in 1855. The result was that, although no rain actually fell during the game, the frequent showers earlier in the month were never able to evaporate before the match was played, leaving the MCG very heavy and soft all through.

No goals were scored in the first quarter, and only one behind in the last. In the third quarter, however, Fitzroy's superior pace and power allowed it to kick three goals with the wind, which gave it a comfortable winning margin.

As in 1927 and 1960, the 1905 Grand Final saw the losing team kick the lowest score for the entire season. In fact, with the exception of the 1927 Grand Final and two games in 1906 and 1908, no V/AFL match has had a lower aggregate score than the 1905 Grand Final's 6.11 (47). Only one match since (Footscray versus Fitzroy in 1953) has had as few as seventeen aggregate scoring shots. Apart from the 1960 Grand Final, Collingwood has not kicked a lower score since 1901.

Result

Teams

 Field umpire - Henry "Ivo" Crapp
 Boundary umpire - Jack Davidson

See also
 1905 VFL season

References

VFL/AFL Grand Finals
Grand
Fitzroy Football Club
Collingwood Football Club
September 1905 sports events